The following lists events that happened during 2013 in the Hashemite Kingdom of Jordan.

Incumbents
Monarch - Abdullah II

Events

January
 January 23 - A parliamentary election is held with boycotting by the opposition, alleging a fraud.

References

 
2010s in Jordan
Jordan
Years of the 21st century in Jordan
Jordan